Medea de Novara (18 April 1905 – 1 November 2001) was a Liechtensteiner-born actress who appeared in Mexican films. She was married to the Mexican film director Miguel Contreras Torres. She was noted for her resemblance to the Empress Carlota of Mexico who she played four times on screen.

Selected filmography
 Juarez and Maximillian (1934)
 The Mad Empress (1939)
 María Magdalena: Pecadora de Magdala (1946)

References

Bibliography
 Dick, Bernard F., Hal Wallis: Producer to the Stars. University Press of Kentucky, 2015.

External links

1905 births
2001 deaths
Mexican film actresses
People from Vaduz
Liechtenstein emigrants
Immigrants to Mexico